America's Center is a convention center located in downtown St. Louis, Missouri, and is situated next to the Dome at America's Center, the former home of the National Football League's St. Louis Rams (now the Los Angeles Rams) and the current home of the XFL's St. Louis BattleHawks.  The Center and the Dome often combine to hold large events. The venue opened in 1977 as the Cervantes Convention Center (named for former mayor Alfonso J. Cervantes), and has held many events over the years, including the Working Women's Survival Show, the All-Canada Show, the National Rifle Association Annual Meeting, the St. Louis Boat and Sports Show, and the triennial Urbana Christian missions conference.  

America's Center was the scene for the 2007 National Rifle Association Annual Meetings and Exhibits, and hosted the DHL Major League Baseball All-Star Fan Fest in July 2009. It hosted the American Society for Quality 2010 meeting.

In the 1990s Trans World Airlines operated a ticket office in the center.

References

External links

 America's Center Convention Complex

Convention centers in Missouri
Event venues established in 1977
Buildings and structures in St. Louis
Tourist attractions in St. Louis
1977 establishments in Missouri